Six national referendums were held in Switzerland during 2015, the first of which were held on 8 March.

March referendums
Two referendums were held on 8 March. The family initiative proposal proposed that child and education allowances should be exempt from income tax, whilst second initiative called for the introduction of a tax on non-renewable energy, with the higher cost of energy consumption compensated by the abolition of VAT. The family initiative was initiated by the Christian Democratic People's Party and the energy initiative was initiated by the Green Liberal Party. The Swiss government recommended the rejection of both initiatives, and both were rejected by voters.

The failed energy initiative received worst vote result for an initiative since 1929.

Results

June referendums
Four referendums were held on 14 June 2015, covering a constitutional amendment regarding reproductive medicine and human gene technology, popular initiatives on scholarships and inheritance tax and a modification of the federal law on radio and television reducing the annual licence fee from 462 to 400 Francs.

Results

References

Referendums in Switzerland
2015 referendums
2015 in Switzerland